Shidi (also Romanized as Shīdī; also known as Shedī) is a village in Chaybasar-e Sharqi Rural District of the Central District of Poldasht County, West Azerbaijan province, Iran. At the 2006 National Census, its population was 820 in 167 households, when it was in the former Poldasht District of Maku County. The following census in 2011 counted 1,000 people in 228 households, by which time the district had been separated from the county, Poldasht County established, and divided into two districts: the Central and Aras Districts. The latest census in 2016 showed a population of 881 people in 215 households; it was the largest village in its rural district.

References 

Poldasht County

Populated places in West Azerbaijan Province

Populated places in Poldasht County